Mykhailo Zherbin (Жербін Михайло Михайлович 24 December 1911 – 2004) was a Ukrainian composer and engineer.

Recordings
Mykhailo Zherbin: songs: Vocalise-Prelude, Plyve moya dusha, Ostanni kvity Lena Belkina, Violina Petrychenko

References

1911 births
2004 deaths